"This I Promise You" is a ballad by American boy band NSYNC. It was released in September 2000 as the third and final single in the United States and the fourth and final single in Europe from their second studio album, No Strings Attached, in 2000. The song is included on all three of the band's compilation albums: Greatest Hits (2005), The Collection (2010), and The Essential *NSYNC (2014). The single reached number five on the US Billboard Hot 100.

A Spanish language version of the song, titled "Yo te Voy a Amar" was recorded at the same time and released in Spanish-speaking countries such as Mexico, Colombia, Venezuela, Peru, Chile, Bolivia, Paraguay, Uruguay, Argentina, Ecuador, Guatemala, El Salvador, Honduras, Nicaragua, Costa Rica, Panama, Cuba, Dominican Republic, and Spain.

Background
Richard Marx was asked by A&R executive David Novik if he had any songs that he could give to NSYNC, which he specifically requested for a ballad. Initially, the song was written with a three-person girl group in mind, which Marx quickly finished after writing the harmonies specifically for NSYNC.

Marx would later record the song twice, first for the Japanese release of his album Days in Avalon similar to the NSYNC version, and again as a rock song for the European version of his Stories to Tell album. Marx would later use the Days in Avalon version of "This I Promise You" for his Now and Forever: The Ballads album as a duet with Asian singer Sabrina.

Commercial performance
"This I Promise You" was the group's fifth top-ten single in the U.S., reaching number five on the Billboard Hot 100 chart in the autumn of 2000. In addition, the song spent 13 weeks at number one on the Billboard Adult Contemporary chart, the group's first and only song to do so. Internationally, the song reached number twenty-one on the UK Singles Chart.

Music video

Background
The music video was shot at Redwood National Park and San Francisco's Embarcadero in 2000 by Dave Meyers. During the video shoot, Justin Timberlake and Joey Fatone ended up exploring Alcatraz Federal Penitentiary without paying for tickets. Both members were eventually caught when they reached Al Capone's cell, and let off with a warning.

It debuted on an episode of TRL on October 27, 2000.

Synopsis
The video shows the group members clad in  turtlenecks singing in the Redwood National and State Parks, with different shots of different love relationships shown in bubbles floating around the forest. Footage of the San Francisco skyline appears at different intervals and at the key change towards the end of the song, the video pans to the members of NSYNC sitting at a table of an outdoor restaurant along the Embarcadero while eating and singing.

Cover versions
A Spanish language version of the song, titled "Yo te Voy a Amar" was recorded at the same time and released in Spanish-speaking countries such as Mexico, Colombia, Venezuela, Peru, Chile, Bolivia, Paraguay, Uruguay, Argentina, Ecuador, Guatemala, El Salvador, Honduras, Nicaragua, Costa Rica, Panama, Cuba, Dominican Republic, and Spain.

Irish Westlife lead singer Shane Filan included his version of this song on his third solo album Love Always in 2017. This served as a buzz single which was first released online and later released with a music video exclusively available in Europe. He dedicated this song to his wife Gillian.

Track listing

 UK
CD single
 "This I Promise You" (Radio Edit) – 4:27
 "It's Gonna Be Me" (Maurice Joshua Radio Remix) – 4:13	
 "I Thought She Knew" – 3:22

Cassette
 "This I Promise You" (Radio Edit) – 4:27
 "This I Promise You" (Hex Hector Radio Mix) – 3:57
 "I Thought She Knew" – 3:22

 America
Making the Tour exclusive bonus disc
 "This I Promise You" (Live Home Video Mix) – 5:10

 Europe
CD1
 "This I Promise You" (Album Version) – 4:43
 "This I Promise You" (Hex Hector Radio Mix) – 3:57

CD2
 "This I Promise You" (Album Version) – 4:43
 "I Thought She Knew" – 3:22

Limited edition remix single
 "This I Promise You" (Album Version) – 4:43
 "This I Promise You" (Hex Hector Club Mix) – 9:10
 "This I Promise You" (Hex Hector Radio Mix) – 3:57
 "Yo te Voy a Amar" (Spain Only)

Credits and personnel
Personnel
Richard Marx – songwriter, producer, arranger
David Cole – recording engineer, mixing engineer
Adam Barber – vocal recording
Cesar Ramirez – assistant engineer
Ok Hee Kim – assistant engineer
Toby Dearborn – assistant engineer
Jeffrey CJ Vanston – drum and keyboard programming
Michael Thompson – guitar
Chaz Harper – mastering

Charts

Weekly charts

Year-end charts

Release history

See also
List of Billboard Adult Contemporary number ones of 2000 and 2001 (U.S.)

References

External links

2000s ballads
2000 singles
2000 songs
NSYNC songs
Jive Records singles
Pop ballads
Songs written by Richard Marx
Contemporary R&B ballads
Soul ballads